Freaky Little Story is the second album by American independent singer Megan Slankard, released on June 22, 2004.

What Not to Wear
When Slankard appeared in an episode of the TLC show What Not to Wear in late 2004, her songs "Too Bad You" and "Mockingbird" were featured on that episode. Following the broadcast, sales of her album skyrocketed, eventually peaking at #5 on the Amazon.com chart and topping the CD Baby album chart.

Track listing
 "Too Bad You" (Slankard) – 3:24
 "Mocking Bird" (Slankard) – 3:04
 "Dirty Wings" (Slankard) – 3:34
 "Captain Madness" (Slankard) – 4:00
 "Addy's Tattoo" (Slankard) – 3:40
 "Lose Me" (Slankard) – 3:47
 "Give Life" (Slankard) – 4:42
 "Forget" (Slankard) – 4:35
 "Nearly Almost Always Nearly Almost Anything" (Slankard) – 4:59
 "Holding Off" (Slankard) – 3:45
 "It's All My Fault (But I'm Not Sorry)" (Slankard) – 3:57
 "Flying Backwards" (Slankard) – 5:21
 "The Freak Out Song" (Slankard) – 6:19

Personnel
 Megan Slankard - acoustic guitar, arranger, vocals
 Anthony Cole - scratching, sampling
 Mike Hsieh - electric guitar, additional acoustic guitar in "Nearly Almost Always Nearly Almost Anything"
 Dave Moffat - bass
 Ian Stambaugh - drums
 Sam Leachman - cello in "Addy's Tattoo"
 Chris Holmes - electric guitar and shaker in "Give Life"

External links
 [ Allmusic Freaky Little Story album page]

2004 albums
Megan Slankard albums